The Sports Journal was a monthly sports magazine published by Sports Journal Entertainment in Providence, Rhode Island. The first issue was published in 2002, then in newspaper form. The magazine ceased publication in 2007.

Radio program
The Sports Journal hosted a radio program on 1320AM in Providence, Rhode Island, from 2004 until 2006.

External links
Sports Journal Online

2002 establishments in Rhode Island
2007 disestablishments in Rhode Island
Monthly magazines published in the United States
Sports magazines published in the United States
Defunct magazines published in the United States
Magazines established in 2002
Magazines disestablished in 2007
Magazines published in Rhode Island
Mass media in Providence, Rhode Island